World Series of Fighting 8: Gaethje vs. Patishnock was a mixed martial arts event held  in Hollywood, Florida, United States.

Background

This event was supposed to feature the first WSOF Lightweight Championship bout between Justin Gaethje and Gesias Cavalcante. However, Cavalcante had to pull out of the fight due to injury and was replaced by Lewis Gonzalez.  It was then announced that Gonzalez was also forced to pull out of the bout due to injury and he was replaced by Richard Patishnock.

The other title fight on the card featured the first WSOF Women's Strawweight Championship bout between Jessica Aguilar and Alida Gray.

Results

See also 
 World Series of Fighting
 List of WSOF champions
 List of WSOF events

References

World Series of Fighting events
2014 in mixed martial arts
Events in Hollywood, Florida